Aubrayo Razyo Franklin (born August 27, 1980) is a former American football nose tackle and in 2015, he was an assistant coach for the San Francisco 49ers. He was drafted by the Baltimore Ravens in the fifth round of the 2003 NFL Draft. He played college football for the University of Tennessee Volunteers.

He has also played for the San Francisco 49ers, New Orleans Saints, San Diego Chargers, and Indianapolis Colts.

Early years
Franklin attended Science Hill High School in Johnson City, Tennessee and was a letterman in football. In football, as a senior, he was an All-Conference and an All-State honoree and finished his senior season with 12 sacks and 180 tackles.

College career
Franklin played college football at the University of Tennessee where he recorded 70 tackles and two sacks. He majored in arts and sciences.

Professional career

2003 NFL Draft
Franklin was selected by the Baltimore Ravens in the fifth round (146th overall) in the 2003 NFL Draft, after being projected as a late sixth round pick.

Baltimore Ravens
In his rookie year, he only appeared in one game recording one tackle. In his second season with the Ravens, he contributed to the team by making six appearances and two tackles. In 2005, Franklin played in 15 games and notched up 20 tackles and his first career sack at the Denver Broncos on December 11. He also made his first career start a week later against the Green Bay Packers. In his final season with the Ravens, he played in 14 games recording 17 tackles.

San Francisco 49ers
On March 3, 2007, Aubrayo Franklin signed with the San Francisco 49ers, reuniting himself with Coach Mike Nolan, who was his defensive coordinator in Baltimore. In his first season with the team, he played in 14 games recording a career high 26 tackles.

New Orleans Saints
Franklin signed a one-year contract with the New Orleans Saints on August 2, 2011.  After a disappointing 2011 campaign, the Saints elected to allow Franklin to test free agency.

San Diego Chargers
On July 20, 2012, Franklin signed a one-year contract with the San Diego Chargers.

Indianapolis Colts
On March 19, 2013, Franklin signed with the Indianapolis Colts.

Coaching career

San Francisco 49ers
On January 28, 2015, Franklin rejoined the 49ers to an entry-level coaching position under head coach Jim Tomsula, who was his defensive line coach from 2007-2010. After just 1 season, Jim Tomsula was fired thus resulting in a large coaching overhaul that relieved Franklin of his duties.

References

External links
49ers Player Bio

1980 births
Living people
American football defensive tackles
Baltimore Ravens players
Frankfurt Galaxy players
Indianapolis Colts players
Itawamba Indians football players
New Orleans Saints players
People from Johnson City, Tennessee
Players of American football from Tennessee
San Diego Chargers players
San Francisco 49ers coaches
San Francisco 49ers players
Tennessee Volunteers football players